Stadionul Letea Veche is a multi-purpose stadium in Letea Veche, Romania, near Bacău. It is currently used mostly for football matches, is the home ground of CSM Bacău and holds 1,500 people. The stadium was used over time by various clubs, but since 2014 (when Municipal Stadium was closed) more and more teams based in Bacău and its neighborhoods started to use it.

References

External links
Stadionul Letea Veche at soccerway.com

Football venues in Romania
Sport in Bacău County
Buildings and structures in Bacău County